Post-acute withdrawal syndrome (PAWS) is a hypothesized set of persistent impairments that occur after withdrawal from alcohol, opiates, benzodiazepines, antidepressants, and other substances. Infants born to mothers who used substances of dependence during pregnancy may also experience a post-acute withdrawal syndrome. 
While post-acute withdrawal syndrome has been reported by those in the recovery community, there have been few scientific studies supporting its existence outside of protracted benzodiazepine withdrawal.  Because of this, the disorder is not recognized by the Diagnostic and Statistical Manual of Mental Disorders or major medical associations.

Drug use, including alcohol and prescription drugs, can induce symptomatology which resembles mental illness. This can occur both in the intoxicated state and during the withdrawal state. In some cases these substance-induced psychiatric disorders can persist long after detoxification from amphetamine, cocaine, opioid, and alcohol use, causing prolonged psychosis, anxiety or depression. A protracted withdrawal syndrome can occur with symptoms persisting for months to years after cessation of substance use. Benzodiazepines, opioids, alcohol, and any other drug may induce prolonged withdrawal and have similar effects, with symptoms sometimes persisting for years after cessation of use. Psychosis including severe anxiety and depression are commonly induced by sustained alcohol, opioid, benzodiazepine, and other drug use which in most cases abates with prolonged abstinence. Any continued use of drugs or alcohol may increase anxiety, psychosis, and depression levels in some individuals. In almost all cases drug-induced psychiatric disorders fade away with prolonged abstinence, although permanent damage to the brain and nervous system may be caused by continued substance use.

Signs and symptoms
Symptoms can sometimes come and go with wave-like re-occurrences or fluctuations in severity of symptoms. Common symptoms include impaired cognition, irritability, depressed mood, and anxiety; all of which may reach severe levels which can lead to relapse.

The protracted withdrawal syndrome from benzodiazepines, opioids, alcohol and other addictive substances can produce symptoms identical to generalized anxiety disorder as well as panic disorder. Due to the sometimes prolonged nature and severity of benzodiazepine, opioid and alcohol withdrawal, abrupt cessation is not advised.

Hypothesized symptoms of post-acute withdrawal syndrome are:
 Psychosocial dysfunction
 Anhedonia
 Depression
 Impaired interpersonal skills
 Obsessive-compulsive behaviour
 Feelings of guilt
 Autonomic disturbances
 Pessimistic thoughts
 Impaired Attentional control 
 Lack of initiative
 Craving
 Inability to think clearly
 Memory problems
 Emotional overreactions or numbness
 Sleep disturbances
 Extreme fatigue
 Physical coordination problems
 Stress sensitivity
 Increased sensitivity to pain
 Panic disorder
 Psychosis
 Generalized anxiety disorder
 Sleep disturbance (dreams of using, behaviors associated with the life style)
Mourning (the change in lifestyle)

Symptoms occur intermittently, but are not always present. They are made worse by stress or other triggers and may arise at unexpected times and for no apparent reason. They may last for a short while or longer. Any of the following may trigger a temporary return or worsening of the symptoms of post-acute withdrawal syndrome:

 Stressful and/or frustrating situations
 Multitasking
 Feelings of anxiety, fearfulness or anger 
 Social conflicts
 Unrealistic expectations of oneself

Post-acute benzodiazepine withdrawal

Disturbances in mental function can persist for several months or years after withdrawal from benzodiazepines. Psychotic depression persisting for more than a year following benzodiazepine withdrawal has been documented in the medical literature. The patient had no prior psychiatric history. The symptoms reported in the patient included, major depressive disorder with psychotic features, including persistent depressed mood, poor concentration, decreased appetite, insomnia, anhedonia, anergia and psychomotor retardation. The patient also experienced paranoid ideation (believing she was being poisoned and persecuted by co-employees), accompanied by sensory hallucinations. Symptoms developed after abrupt withdrawal of chlordiazepoxide and persisted for 14 months. Various psychiatric medications were trialed which were unsuccessful in alleviating the symptomatology. Symptoms were completely relieved by recommending chlordiazepoxide for irritable bowel syndrome 14 months later. Another case report, reported similar phenomenon in a female patient who abruptly reduced her diazepam dosage from 30 mg to 5 mg per day. She developed electric shock sensations, depersonalisation, anxiety, dizziness, left temporal lobe EEG spiking activity, hallucinations, visual perceptual and sensory distortions which persisted for years.

A clinical trial of patients taking the benzodiazepine alprazolam (Xanax) for eight weeks triggered protracted symptoms of memory deficits which were still present after up to eight weeks post cessation of alprazolam.

Dopamine agonist protracted withdrawal
After long-term use of dopamine agonists, a withdrawal syndrome may occur during dose reduction or discontinuation with the following possible side effects:  anxiety, panic attacks, dysphoria, depression, agitation, irritability, suicidal ideation, fatigue, orthostatic hypotension, nausea, vomiting, diaphoresis, generalized pain, and drug cravings. For some individuals, these withdrawal symptoms are short-lived and make a full recovery, for others a protracted withdrawal syndrome may occur with withdrawal symptoms persisting for months or years.

Cause
The syndrome may be in part due to persisting physiological adaptations in the central nervous system manifested in the form of continuing but slowly reversible tolerance, disturbances in neurotransmitters and resultant hyperexcitability of neuronal pathways. However, data supports "neuronal and overwhelming cognitive normalization" in regards to chronic amphetamine use and PAWS.  Stressful situations arise in early recovery, and the symptoms of post acute withdrawal syndrome produce further distress. It is important to avoid or to deal with the triggers that make post acute withdrawal syndrome worse. The types of symptomatology and impairments in severity, frequency, and duration associated with the condition vary depending on the drug of use.

Treatment
The condition gradually improves over a period of time which can range from six months to several years in more severe cases.

People with longer term and heavier substance use have caused damage to the nervous system, where, after cessation of the primary addictive substance, the opioid receptors may become favorable to any potential agonist. This places people with longer term and heavier substance use at risk of becoming addicted to any other agonist with very little use of the secondary agonist. Abstinence from all agonists, sometimes taking multiple years, is required for full recovery. 

Flumazenil was found to be more effective than placebo in reducing feelings of hostility and aggression in patients who had been free of benzodiazepines for 4 to 266 weeks. This may suggest a role for flumazenil in treating protracted benzodiazepine withdrawal symptoms.

Acamprosate has been found to be effective in alleviating some of the post acute withdrawal symptoms of alcohol withdrawal. Carbamazepine or trazodone may also be effective in the treatment of post acute withdrawal syndrome in regards to alcohol use. Cognitive behavioral therapy can also help the post acute withdrawal syndrome especially when cravings are a prominent feature.

See also
Alcohol withdrawal syndrome
Antidepressant discontinuation syndrome
Benzodiazepine withdrawal syndrome
Opioid use disorder
Post-SSRI sexual dysfunction

References

Adverse effects of psychoactive drugs
Withdrawal syndromes